Rail transport in Togo consists of  (2014) of  railway.

Operators

Lines

Lomé–Aného railway
Lomé–Blitta railway
Lomé–Kpalimé railway
Hahotoé–Kpémé railway (operated by CTMB)

Towns served by rail

 Lomé - port and national capital
 Blitta - terminus of the Lomé–Blitta railway

Railway links with adjacent countries
  Burkina Faso - no - same  gauge
  Benin - no - same  gauge
  Ghana - no - break-of-gauge  / .

Standards
 Coupling – Centre buffer and two side chains 
 Brakes – Vacuum brake
 Maximum speed – up to 35 km/h

History

Construction of the first railway line in Togo, the Lomé–Aného railway, began in 1904.
In 1980, the average distance travelled by one person was 50 kilometers.
A siding across the border from a cement plant in Aflao, Ghana, to the port of Lomé was completed in 2014.

AfricaRail
Togo is a participant in the AfricaRail project, an Indian proposal has surfaced to link the railways in Benin and Togo with landlocked Niger and Burkina Faso.

See also 

Transport in Togo

References

External links

 UN Map
 History of rail transport in Togo on fahrplancenter.com